USS Saginaw (LST-1188) was the tenth of the s of the United States Navy which replaced the traditional bow door-design tank landing ships (LSTs). The second ship of that name, Saginaw was named after the river in Michigan. The LST was constructed by National Steel and Shipbuilding Company of San Diego, California, launched in 1970 and commissioned in 1971. During service with the United States Navy, the ship took part in US efforts in the Lebanese civil war and the Gulf War. Saginaw was decommissioned on 28 June 1994 and was transferred to the Royal Australian Navy on 28 August that year.

The ship was towed back to the United States and broken up for scrap at New Orleans, Louisiana in 2013.

Design and description
However, the traditional bow door form for LSTs would not be capable. Therefore, the designers of the Newport class came up with a design of a traditional ship hull with a  aluminum ramp slung over the bow supported by two derrick arms. This made the Newport class the first to depart from the standard LST design that had been developed in early World War II.

Saginaw was fitted with six Alco 16-645-ES diesel engines turning two shafts, three to each shaft. The ship was also equipped with a bow thruster to allow for better maneuvering near causeways and to hold position while offshore during the unloading of amphibious vehicles.

The Newport class were larger and faster than previous LSTs and were able to transport tanks, heavy vehicles and engineer groups and supplies that were too large for helicopters or smaller landing craft to carry. The LSTs have a ramp forward of the superstructure that connects the lower tank deck with the main deck and a passage large enough to allow access to the parking area amidships. The vessels are also equipped with a stern gate to allow the unloading of amphibious vehicles directly into the water or to unload onto a utility landing craft (LCU) or pier. At either end of the tank deck there is a  turntable that permits vehicles to turn around without having to reverse. The vessels also have davits for four vehicle and personnel landing craft (LCVPs) and could carry four pontoon causeway sections along the sides of the hull.

Saginaw was initially armed with four Mark 33 /50 caliber guns in two twin turrets. The vessel was equipped with two Mk 63 gun control fire systems (GCFS) for the 3-inch guns, but these were removed in 1977–1978. The ship also had SPS-10 surface search radar. Atop the stern gate, the vessels mounted a helicopter deck. They had a maximum complement of 213 including 11 officers.

Construction and career

United States Navy service

The LST was ordered as the first hull of the third group in Fiscal Year 1967 on 15 July 1966. The ship was laid down on 24 May 1969 by the National Steel and Shipbuilding Company, in San Diego, California. Named for a river in Michigan, Saginaw was launched on 7 February 1970, sponsored by the wife of Congressman James Harvey of Michigan. The vessel was commissioned into the United States Navy at the Long Beach Naval Shipyard on 23 January 1971.

Saginaw departed San Diego on 4 March 1971, bound for the United States East Coast to a new home port. Soon after starting the journey, the ship's lookouts sighted a mechanized landing craft, LCM(6)-805, adrift at sea. Following that incident, Saginaw proceeded to NAB Little Creek, Virginia via Acapulco, Mexico, and the Panama Canal arriving on 26 March. Early in April, while preparing for shakedown, the ship tested a new concept for the Newport class by hoisting a major self-contained medical unit (MUST) onto the tank deck. This was done to evaluate the feasibility of setting up complete hospital facilities on a Newport-class deck after offloading troops, vehicles, and cargo. The vessel performed shakedown and routine operations for the rest of the year.

On 16 January 1972 Saginaw departed Little Creek to participate in Operation "Snowy Beach" with Amphibious Squadron 8 at Reid State Park Beach, Maine. On 28 January the exercise ended, and on 23 February the LST embarked Marines at Morehead City, North Carolina and sailed for the Mediterranean Sea to join the 6th Fleet. For the next five months, Saginaw participated in six amphibious exercises at various points across the Mediterranean. The LST left the 6th Fleet in early August, and returned to Morehead City to debark Marines on 21 August before sailing for Little Creek. Saginaw resumed routine operations for the remainder of the year.

Saginaw made two voyages to Vieques Island, Puerto Rico, in January and early February 1973, to transport Marines to and from exercises held on that island. Beginning in March the LST began a series of deployments to the Caribbean Sea for training and international naval exercises as part of the Caribbean Amphibious Ready Group. Saginaw returned to Little Creek on 6 December and was inactive for all of 1973. Saginaw spent the first four months of 1974 in local operations out of Little Creek. On 10 May 1974 the LST embarked Marines at Morehead City, then got underway for Rota, Spain to rejoin the 6th Fleet. Saginaw arrived at Rota on 20 May, and through June, was underway in the Mediterranean.

Saginaw was assigned to the Apollo 17 recovery mission in 1972. The vessel took part in the multi-national exercise Display Determination with NATO in 1977. The LST aided in the inter-fleet transfer of the experimental hydrofoil  in 1979 and supported Cuban refugee operations in 1980.

In May 1982 five ships of Amphibious Squadron 4 with 1,800 Marines from the 32nd Marine Amphibious Unit (32nd MAU) deployed to the Mediterranean with the detachment being designated Mediterranean Amphibious Ready Group 2-82 (MARG 2-82). MARG 2-82 arrived at Rota on 6 June and were swiftly redirected to the Lebanese coast to evacuate civilians after Israel had attacked the nation earlier that day. On 24 June 1982, during the Lebanese civil war, 800 civilians were evacuated from Juniyah, Lebanon by MARG 2-82 ships. On 28 August and 29 September, Saginaw entered Beirut harbor to provide vehicles and personnel for the Multi-National Force. By 29 October, a relief force had arrived to replace MARG 2-82 in the area, and the unit sailed for the United States on 1 November. Saginaw participated in the military exercises Cold Winter 1983, Eastern Wind 87, and Teamwork 88 with NATO forces.

During the Gulf War, Saginaw was part of Transit Group 2, tasked with transporting part of the 4th Marine Expeditionary Brigade via the Mediterranean to the Persian Gulf. Transit Group 2 departed Morehead City on 20 August 1990 and united with the other transit groups off Masirah Island on 16 September. Transit Group 2 joined Amphibious Group 2 (PhibGru2). PhibGru2 was split back into respective transit groups on 24 March 1991 and Transit Group 2 returned to Camp Lejeune, North Carolina on 17 April after a ceasefire had been declared on 1 April. This was followed by involvement in the exercises Philblex and Display Determination and participation in US Marine Corps' BASCOLEX. Saginaw was decommissioned on 28 June 1994 and struck from the U.S. Naval Vessel Register the same day. Saginaw was sold to Australia as part of the Security Assistance Program. However, delays in the authorization of the sale by the US government led to Kanimblas transferral only on 24 August 1994.

Royal Australian Navy service

Saginaw was renamed HMAS Kanimbla (L 51) in Australian service and commissioned into the Royal Australian Navy on 29 August at Norfolk, Virginia. Kanimbla underwent conversion in May 1995 at Forgacs Shipbuilding, Newcastle, New South Wales. The LST was significantly modified by removing its bow ramps and adding another deck over the bow of the ship, allowing for a third landing spot and increased aviation fuel capacity. Over the new deck two LCM-8 landing craft were carried when the third landing spot was not in use, and were handled by a 70-ton crane. Improved medical facilities were also constructed. A hangar was installed aft, allowing for the stowage of four Seahawk helicopters. Kanimbla was based at Sydney, Australia. Kanimbla was towed back to the United States in October 2013 and arrived in New Orleans, Louisiana, for scrapping by Southern Scrap Recycling.

Notes

Citations

References

External links

 USS Saginaw Home Page

Newport-class tank landing ships
Ships built in San Diego
1970 ships
Cold War amphibious warfare vessels of the United States
Ships transferred from the United States Navy to the Royal Australian Navy
Saginaw River